Jessica P. Einhorn served as Dean of Washington's Paul H. Nitze School of Advanced International Studies (SAIS) of the Johns Hopkins University from 2001 until 2012. Einhorn succeeded Paul Wolfowitz, who resigned in 2001 to become the U.S. Deputy Secretary of Defense. Einhorn is also a member of the Board of Directors of Time Warner, Inc., a member of the Board of Directors of BlackRock, Inc., a former director of the Council on Foreign Relations, and a former managing director at the World Bank.

Einhorn holds a Ph.D. in politics from Princeton University, an M.A. in international relations from SAIS, and a B.A. from Barnard College. She is the first alumnus of SAIS to become its dean.

References

External links
 

Johns Hopkins University faculty
Barnard College alumni
Princeton University alumni
Paul H. Nitze School of Advanced International Studies alumni
World Bank people
Living people
Year of birth missing (living people)
American corporate directors
Warner Bros. Discovery people
American women business executives
American officials of the United Nations
American women academics
21st-century American women